Anubias barteri var. caladiifolia was first described by Adolf Engler in 1915.

Distribution
West Africa: South-west Nigeria, Fernando Po, Cameroon.

Description
This plant's large leave blades are 1.5-2.5 times as long (10–23 cm) as wide (5-14) cm long. The petioles are 10–54 cm long, from 1-2.5 times as long as the blade. The base of the leaf is typically lobed.

Cultivation
Like most Anubias species, this plant grows well partially and fully submersed and the rhizome must be above the substrate, attached to rocks or wood. It grows well in a range of lighting and prefers a temperature range of 22-28 degrees C. It can be propagated by dividing the rhizome or by separating side shoots.

References

barteri var. caladiifolia
Aquatic plants
Flora of Cameroon
Plants described in 1915
Flora of Nigeria
Flora of Equatorial Guinea